Lusaka National Park is located to the south-east of the city of Lusaka in Zambia. It is Zambia's newest national park, established in 2011 and officially opened in 2015. It is also Zambia's smallest national park at 6,715 hectares. The park was established over an area that was previously forest reserve and is entirely fenced.

References 

National parks of Zambia
Protected areas established in 2011